The Deaf world records in swimming are the fastest ever performances of deaf athletes, which are recognised and ratified by the International Committee of Sports for the Deaf (ICSD) and FINA.

All records were set in finals unless noted otherwise.

Long Course (50 m)

Men

Women

Mixed Relay

Short Course (25 m)

Men

Women

See also
List of World Deaf Swimming Championships records
List of deaf world records in athletics

References
General
Deaf world records – Long Course – Men
Deaf world records – Long Course – Women
Deaf world records – Long Course – Mixed
Deaf world records – Short Course – Men 27 November 2020 updated
Deaf world records – Short Course – Women 13 December 2020 updated
Deaf world records – Short Course – Mixed
Specific

External links
ICSD Official web site

Deaf world
Deaf sports